Dominique Weis  is a Canadian scientist. She is a Canada Research Chair in the Geochemistry of the Earth's Mantleat at the University of British Columbia.

Early life and education 
Weis obtained her B.Sc in Geology and Mineralogy (1979) and PhD (1982) from the Université Libre de Bruxelles (Belgium). She later completed a master's degree in Environmental Sciences (1983) and Habilitation Geochemistry (1992) at Université Libre de Bruxelles.

She later undertook Postdoctoral Research Fellowships at University of Paris VII (1984) and California Institute of Technology (1985–7). Weis was also a Chercheur Qualifié FNRS (1985–1993), Maître de Recherches (1993–1998) and Directeur de Recherches (1998–2001) at the University of Brussels, Belgium.

Career
In 2002, Weis was appointed a Tier 1 Canada Research Chair at the University of British Columbia in Vancouver, Canada as she established the Pacific Centre for Isotopic and Geochemical Research (PCIGR). In this role, she published "High‐precision isotopic characterization of USGS reference materials by TIMS and MC‐ICP‐MS" in the journal Geochemistry, Geophysics, Geosystems.

By 2009, she was the recipient of the Killam Faculty Research Senior Fellows Award and renewed as a Canada Research Chair. The following year, the PCIGR was approved for funding from the Canada Foundation for Innovation and B.C. Knowledge Development Fund. This allowed the centre to update its geochemical analytical equipment. As a result of her research, Weis was elected a Geochemical Fellow by the Geochemical Society and the European Association of Geochemistry.

In 2016, Weis was elected to sit on the Geochemical Society Board and a Fellow of the Royal Society of Canada. In the following years, she was also renewed as a Canada Research Chair in the Geochemistry of the Earth’s Mantle and named President-elect of the Volcanology, Geochemistry, and Petrology Section of the American Geophysical Union.

Research interests 
Weis' innovative use of trace element and isotopic geochemistry spans a wide range of applications in the Earth and environmental sciences. Her research interests include the distribution of elements and isotopes in Earth systems with an emphasis on the use of  abundances and isotopic ratios in earth (petrology/volcanology/geochronology) and environmental sciences. This includes defining the source and evolution of igneous and metamorphic rocks, the interactions between different reservoirs (mantle, crust and atmosphere) and the role of tectonic settings. Other interests include geochemical and isotopic studies of sedimentary rocks, global changes and reconstitution of past environments; distribution of pollutants in natural and anthropogenic systems; application of non-traditional heavy stable to environmental issues and analytical technique developments, techniques for high precision chemical and isotope analysis.

References

Year of birth missing (living people)
Living people
Canadian geochemists
Academic staff of the University of British Columbia
Canada Research Chairs
Fellows of the Royal Society of Canada